Massive Cauldron of Chaos is the sixth studio album by Norwegian black metal band 1349. It was released on 29 September 2014 through Season of Mist.  The album marks a break in the usual trend for the band to release album artwork in a jet black colour, instead using white.

Track listing

Reception

The album has mostly received a positive reception.

Credits
1349
 Ravn – vocals
 Seidemann – bass
 Archaon – guitars
 Frost – drums

Production
 Jarrett Prichard – production, mixing, mastering
 Ravn – mixing
 Johannes Hoie – illustration
 Marcelo Vasco – layout

References

2014 albums
1349 (band) albums
Season of Mist albums